Some Loud Thunder is the second studio album by American musical project Clap Your Hands Say Yeah. It was released on January 29, 2007, in the United Kingdom, and the next day in the United States by Wichita Recordings; but people who pre-ordered the album were able to legally download it from Insound starting January 16. The album was produced by Dave Fridmann, known for his work with Mercury Rev and The Flaming Lips.

The album debuted at #47 on the Billboard 200 album chart with 19,000 copies sold. "Satan Said Dance" was ranked the 95th best song of 2007 by Rolling Stone.

Track listing
All tracks written by Alec Ounsworth, except where noted.

"Some Loud Thunder"
"Emily Jean Stock"
"Mama, Won't You Keep Them Castles in the Air and Burning?"
"Love Song No. 7"
"Satan Said Dance"
"Upon Encountering the Crippled Elephant"
"Goodbye to Mother and the Cove" (Ounsworth, Tyler Sargent, Sean Greenhalgh)
"Arm and Hammer"
"Yankee Go Home"
"Underwater (You and Me)"
"Five Easy Pieces"
"The Sword Song" (Japanese release and iTunes bonus track)

References

2007 albums
Clap Your Hands Say Yeah albums
Wichita Recordings albums
V2 Records albums
Albums produced by Dave Fridmann
Albums recorded at Tarbox Road Studios